Menace Clan was an American hip-hop duo composed of Dante "Dee" Miller and Walter "Assassin" Adams formally signed to Rap-a-Lot Records.

After signing with Rap-a-Lot, the duo appeared on Poppa LQ's Your Entertainment, My Reality and Bushwick Bill's Phantom of the Rapra, and contributed a verse to the All-Star track, "The Points". The duo's debut album Da Hood was released on October 10, 1995, but it failed to sell a significant number of copies and only reached number 44 on the Billboard Top R&B/Hip-Hop Albums. After the release of Da Hood, Menace Clan remained with Rap-a-Lot, appearing on the Geto Boys The Resurrection and Scarface's My Homies, before leaving the label in 1998. The duo's last appearance was in 2000 on D-Red's Smokin' & Lean'n 2000. Dante also appeared on the track, "My Block", featured on Houston rapper Lil Flip's 2000 underground debut album The Leprechaun.

Discography

References 

Hip hop groups from California
Musical groups established in 1993
Musical groups disestablished in 1998
Musical groups from Los Angeles
Rap-A-Lot Records artists
Rappers from Los Angeles
1993 establishments in California
Gangsta rap groups
Crips
American musical duos
Hip hop duos